Einar Aslaksen Landvik (25 March 1898 – 27 November 1993) was a Norwegian Nordic skier who won the Holmenkollen medal in 1925.

He was born in Kviteseid and died in Tinn.

Landvik finished fifth in both the 18 km cross-country event and the individual ski jumping at the 1924 Winter Olympics in Chamonix.

He won bronze in the nordic combined at the 1926 FIS Nordic World Ski Championships in Lahti.

Cross-country skiing results
All results are sourced from the International Ski Federation (FIS).

Olympic Games

References

External links
. Cross country profile
. Nordic combined profile
 - click Holmenkollmedaljen for downloadable pdf file 

1898 births
1993 deaths
Norwegian male cross-country skiers
Norwegian male ski jumpers
Norwegian male Nordic combined skiers
Olympic cross-country skiers of Norway
Olympic ski jumpers of Norway
Ski jumpers at the 1924 Winter Olympics
Cross-country skiers at the 1924 Winter Olympics
Holmenkollen medalists
FIS Nordic World Ski Championships medalists in Nordic combined
People from Kviteseid
Sportspeople from Vestfold og Telemark